Momodou Ceesay (born 1945 in Banjul, Gambia) is an artist and author.

Early life
Ceesay's early education was in Banjul, followed by scholarships and academic studies at Suffield Academy and Wesleyan University, Connecticut (USA). In 1970, he received a bachelor's degree with majors in languages and literature. He continued his studies in France at the University of Poitiers and La Sorbonne. For his studies of the French language, Ceesay received diplomas from each of these universities.

Career
After graduation, Ceesay decided to become an artist. Essentially self-taught, he creates acrylics, watercolors, and serigraphs. In his printmaking, Momodou produces small editions by hand, without a mechanized studio. One of his earlier serigraphs entitled "Evening Works" was selected by UNICEF as one of their 1976 designs.

Exhibitions
Solo: 
Goethe Institute, Lagos, Nigeria
La Gruta Galeria, Bogota, Colombia
National Museum of History, Teipei, Taiwan
Theatre National Sorano, Dakar, Senegal
University of Massachusetts Library, Boston
Galerija Likovnih Samorastnikov, Trebnje, Slovenia
Ille-lfe Museum, Philadelphia, Pennsylvania

Group:
Gallery of Art, Howard University, Washington, D.C.
Canterbury Museum, Christchurch, New Zealand
Studio Museum in Harlem, New York
ISC Art Gallery, UCLA, Los Angeles
International Biennial of Color Graphics, Switzerland
Museum of African American Art, Los Angeles
Golden State Mutual Insurance Company, Los Angeles
National Center for Afro-American Artists, Boston
"Africa Now!", World Bank, Washington, DC (2007–09)
"Voices of Courage", Freedom To Create Prize Exhibition (2010) 
Mojo Gallery, Dubai (2011): "As It Is! Contemporary Art from Africa & the Diaspora"

Bibliography
Books and articles about Momodou Ceesay: 
Donahue, Benedict. "The Cultural Arts of Africa", Washington, D.C.: University Press of America, 1979. See page 167.
Fosu, Kojo. "20th Century Art of Africa", Zaria: Gasklya Corporation, 1986. Illus. See pages 155–156. (Addit.Ref: Contemporary African Art, 1977)
Gardella, David. "Momodou Ceesay of the Gambia", African Arts (Los Angeles) 7(4): 40–41, summer 1974. illus.
"Massachusetts: African Contemporary Art"; [exhibition, Gallery of Art, Howard University, Washington, D.C., 30 April – 31 July 1977]. Washington, D.C.: The Gallery, 1977. [31]pp. illus.
Harper, Mary. "A Distinctive Style", [review of Exhibition of Gambian artist Momodou Ceesay at Safari Afro-Gallery, London (1989)]. West Africa (London) no. 3755: 1314, 7–13 August, 198. illus.
Kennedy, Jean. "New Currents, Ancient Rivers: Contemporary African Artists in a Generation of Change". Washington, D.C.: Smithsonian Institution Press, 1992. illus. See page 94.

References

External links 
"Voices of Courage" Freedom To Create Prize http://www.freedomtocreate.com
"The Creative Genius of Momodou Ceesay" https://web.archive.org/web/20121005214503/http://observer.gm/africa/gambia/article/the-creative-genius-of-momodou-ceesay-the-renown-gambian-painter

1945 births
Living people
Wesleyan University alumni